Thiemo de Bakker was the defending champion but chose not to compete.
Guido Andreozzi defeated top seed Diego Sebastián Schwartzman 6–7(5–7), 7–6(7–4), 6–0.

Seeds

Draw

Finals

Top half

Bottom half

References
 Main Draw
 Qualifying Draw

Copa San Juan Gobierno - Singles
2013 Singles
Copa